Two ships of the United States Navy have been named Osage after the Osage Native American tribe.

 , a single-turreted Neosho-class river monitor
 , a vehicle landing ship which served during World War II

Sources
 

Osage